"Bye Bye Baby" is the first single by R&B singer Mary Wells, released in September 1960 on the Motown label. The song was one of Motown's earliest hit singles and showcased a much rougher vocal than the singer had during her later years.

History

Recording
In 1960, Wells, then just 17 years of age, was a nightclub singer who was struggling to make ends meet in Detroit. She aspired to be a songwriter as well, so she wrote a song for fellow Detroiter and R&B singer Jackie Wilson. She saw Berry Gordy while attempting to deliver "Bye Bye, Baby" to Wilson, and asked Gordy to give Wilson her song. But Gordy, having severed ties with Wilson's manager to form Motown, asked Wells to sing it herself for Motown. Mary recorded "Bye Bye Baby" in her version of Jackie Wilson's style. Reports claim that the teen had to record the song 26 times or more, before Gordy had a version he approved for release. According to Detroit music mogul Johnnie Mae Matthews, Wells had come to her with four lines of the song, which Matthews said she finished up. When the song was issued, she didn't get a songwriting credit.

Release and reaction
Released in September 1960, the song became an R&B hit reaching number eight on the Billboard R&B singles chart and crossed over to pop stations where it peaked at number forty-five. It was significant as the first single released under one of the Motown subsidiaries nationally after the label's first singles were released through distributing labels such as United Artists.

Covers
American all-female rock group Goldie and the Gingerbreads recorded their version in December, 1963 but it was not released until the 1990s.

The song was covered in 1965 by soul singer Betty Everett, in 1966 by Tony Jackson and the Vibrations and in 1979 by rock musician Bonnie Raitt. Wells remade it for her 1968 album, Servin' Up Some Soul. The 1968 re-recording was produced by Bobby Womack. Wells re-recorded it again for her 1983 album I'm a Lady: The Old, New & Best of Mary Wells. Cher performed the song on her "Love Hurts Tour" in 1992. The song was covered in 2001 by The Detroit Cobras.

The song features on the soundtrack for the 1991 film The Commitments, as sung by Maria Doyle Kennedy.

Personnel
 Lead vocals by Mary Wells
 Background vocals (album version only) by The Rayber Voices (Raynoma Liles Gordy, Brian Holland, Sonny Sanders, and Robert Bateman)
 Instrumentation by The Funk Brothers
 Written by Mary Wells
 Produced by Berry Gordy

References

1960 debut singles
Mary Wells songs
Song recordings produced by Berry Gordy
Songs written by Mary Wells
1960 songs
Motown singles